Lutheran High School North is a private Christian high school in Houston, Texas, United States. The school is affiliated with the Lutheran Church–Missouri Synod and is a member of the Texas Association of Private and Parochial Schools. It is in the Garden Oaks area.

History
Lutheran High School opened at 6901 Woodridge, Houston in 1949. In 1982, as the Houston area continued to grow, Lutheran High School was closed and split into two campuses administered by LEAH. One of the schools, Lutheran High School North, was opened on October  1,1980 at 1130 W. 34th Street on the north side of the city. The other campus, Lutheran High School South, which later became Lutheran South Academy, was opened at 7703 South Loop East, near the intersection of the 610 Loop and Interstate 45; that is now the site of the Harris County Department of Education.

See also

 Christianity in Houston

References

External links 

 

High schools in Houston
Educational institutions established in 1949
Lutheran schools in Texas
Private high schools in Houston
Christian schools in Houston
1949 establishments in Texas
Secondary schools affiliated with the Lutheran Church–Missouri Synod